Vrnčani is a village in the municipality of Gornji Milanovac, Serbia. According to the 2011 census, the village has a population of 330 people.

References

Populated places in Moravica District